The Diehl AeroNautical XTC Hydrolight is an American amphibious flying boat ultralight aircraft that was designed and produced by Diehl AeroNautical in the 1980s.  The prototype first flew in March 1982, with production of kits commencing the following year.

Design and development
It features a cantilever mid-wing, a canard foreplane, dual vertical tails, a single-seat, open cockpit, re-positionable tricycle landing gear and a single engine in pusher configuration.  

The aircraft's hull is made from fiberglass, while the wing has a Kevlar-epoxy spar with its flying surfaces covered in bonded Mylar. Its  span wing is located behind the cockpit. Some aircraft were delivered with optional enclosed cockpits for all-weather flying. The landing gear repositions clear of the hull for water landings and is sprung on all three wheels. The nose wheel is steerable. The control system is three-axis, with the canard for pitch, twin rudders for yaw and spoilers for roll control. The XTC is very aerodynamically clean and produces a 14:1 glide ratio. Strongly built, the aircraft is rated for +8/-8g.

Operational history
In service many owners replaced the KFM 107 powerplant, as it left the aircraft underpowered, especially for water operations. Owners report that the XTC is pitch sensitive in flight.

Specifications (XTC)

References

1980s United States ultralight aircraft
Homebuilt aircraft
Single-engined pusher aircraft
Amphibious aircraft
Canard aircraft
Mid-wing aircraft